Brendan Cronin may refer to:

Brendan Cronin (Gaelic footballer), see Billy Myers (Gaelic footballer)
Brendan Cronin, character in Strangers (Dean Koontz novel)